Avalanche Express is a 1979 Cold War adventure thriller film starring Lee Marvin, Robert Shaw, Maximilian Schell, and Linda Evans and produced and directed by Mark Robson. The plot is about the struggle over a defecting Soviet general. The screenplay by Abraham Polonsky was based on a 1977 novel by Colin Forbes. It was the last film for both Shaw and Robson, who each died in 1978.

Plot
Soviet general Marenkov (Robert Shaw) decides to defect to the West and CIA agent Harry Wargrave (Lee Marvin) leads the team that is to get him out. Wargrave decides that Marenkov should travel across Europe by train, on the fictional Atlantic Express. The idea is to lure the Russians into attacking the train and thus discover who their secret agents in Europe are. Consequently, during the train journey they must survive both a terrorist attack and an avalanche, all planned by KGB spy-catcher Nikolai Bunin (Maximilian Schell).

Cast
 Lee Marvin as Col. Harry Wargrave 
 Robert Shaw as Gen. Marenkov (Voice later dubbed by Robert Reitty.)
 Linda Evans as Elsa Lang
 Maximilian Schell as Col. Nikolai Bunin
 Joe Namath as Leroy
 Horst Buchholz as Julian Scholten
 Mike Connors as Haller 
 Claudio Cassinelli as Col. Molinari 
 Kristina Nel as Helga Mann 
 David Hess as Geiger 
 Günter Meisner as Rudi Muehler 
 Sylva Langova as Olga 
 Cyril Shaps as Sedov 
 Vladek Sheybal as Zannbin 
 Arthur Brauss as Neckermann
 Sky du Mont as Philip John 
 Richard Marner as General Prachko 
 Arnold Drummond as Commissar (Maxim Gorky) 
 Paul Glawion as Alfredo 
 Dan van Husen as Bernardo

Production problems
During production in Ireland, both director Mark Robson and starring actor Robert Shaw died of heart attacks within weeks of each other. Monte Hellman was brought in to finish the direction and Gene Corman (Roger Corman's brother) was called in to complete Robson's duties as producer.

Robert Rietti was hired to re-record Robert Shaw's dialogue in the opening scene, as it was decided to redo that scene in Russian with English subtitles instead of having the Russians speak broken English. As a consequence, for continuity, all of Shaw's dialogue throughout the film was re-recorded by Rietti.

Hellman, Corman and Rietti were not credited for their work, but the film's end credit contains a note stating: "The producers wish to express their appreciation to Monte Hellman and Gene Corman for their post production services."

Critical reaction
Vincent Canby of The New York Times criticized the film's tackiness, suggesting it was copied from The Cassandra Crossing and likening it to the work of exploitation filmmaker Lew Grade, criticising the actors as appearing "at a loss".
Time Out called it "awful", "formulary" and "hammily acted" but explained its curious editing as resulting from the production problems. The Radio Times gave it 2/5 stars, noting its disjointed quality but praising the acting and snowy special effects. Leonard Maltin's annual publication "TV Movies" gives the film a BOMB rating.

See also
 List of American films of 1979

References

External links
 
 
 
 

1979 films
1970s action thriller films
1970s spy thriller films
American action thriller films
Irish action thriller films
American disaster films
American spy thriller films
1970s English-language films
English-language Irish films
Films directed by Mark Robson
Cold War spy films
Films about terrorism in Europe
Films based on British novels
Films based on thriller novels
Films set in Italy
Films set in Switzerland
Films set in the Alps
Films shot in Bavaria
Films set in West Germany
Films set in Belgium
Films set in Amsterdam
Films set in the Soviet Union
Films set on trains
Avalanches in film
1970s American films